Andrew Kirkpatrick is a British mountaineer, author, motivational speaker and monologist. He is best known as a big wall climber, having scaled Yosemite's El Capitan over 30 times, including five solo ascents, and two one-day ascents, as well as climbing in Patagonia, Alaska, Antarctica and the Alps.  He has also crossed Greenland by ski. In 2014 he guided Alex Jones up Moonlight Buttress, Zion National Park, raising £1.9 million for Sport Relief.

Film, TV and radio
Kirkpatrick has worked in film and TV as a safety advisor and stunt rigger, including Charlie and the Chocolate Factory, as well as in programmes for CBBC, ITN, BBC and BBC Scotland. The BBC programme "The Big Climb" about his ascent of El Capitan with his 13-year-old daughter Ella won multiple awards. In 2014, he guided the TV presenter Alex Jones up the Moonlight Buttress in Zion National Park to raise money for Sports Relief, raising £1.9 million. In 2014, Kirkpatrick gave a fifteen-minute talk on BBC Radio 4 in its Four Thought slot on the subject of the importance of risky play for children. In January 2015, he followed the route of the heroes of telemark on the Hardangervidda by ski with his two children for a BBC film on risky play.

Writing
Kirkpatrick's dyslexia is well documented, and these struggles form part of his first book, Psychovertical.

Kirkpatrick is only the third person to win the Boardman Tasker Prize for Mountain Literature twice (Paul Pritchard and Jim Perrin being the other authors to win twice). His first win was with his first book, Psychovertical in 2008 and his second with his book, Cold Wars: Climbing the fine line between risk and reality.

Psychovertical has been translated into German (published in 2010 as Psychovertikal by AS Verlag), Polish, Italian and Korean. The Italian version was published in 2011 as Psychovertical by Edizioni Versante Sud and in 2012 won the literary prize Gambrinus "Giuseppe Mazzotti". It is also published in French.

Bibliography
 Down, Akreative, 2020, 
 Psychovertical, London: Hutchinson, 2008, 
 Unknown Pleasures, Vertebrate, 2018, 
 Higher Education, Akreative, 2018,  
 30 Years of Climbing Magazine, Climbing Magazine, 1999, 
 Cold Wars, Vertebrate, 2011, 
 Zimne Wojny by Taschenbuch 
 Kalte Kriege, AS Verlag, 2012, 
 Cold Wars, The Mountaineers, USA, 
 1000+ Climbing Tips Akreative 
 Nutcraft Akreative ASIN: B00F8CVQ0S
 Hooks Akreative ASIN: B008LZRO0A
 Driven Akreative

See also
Rope solo climbing

References

External links
Radio Interview | National Geographic
"The Tapestry of the Experience" | interview by Alastair Humphreys
Storytelling, Dyslexia, and Antarctica | Interview by The Adventure Journal
 Interview | Vertical Life
The Dark Side of Climbing | Vague Direction interview
The Boss at the bottom of the world | British Mountaineering Council interview
 Official website

Living people
1971 births
People from Kingston upon Hull
British mountain climbers
British rock climbers
Sportspeople from Yorkshire
Boardman Tasker Prize winners
British motivational speakers
English male non-fiction writers
20th-century English male writers
English non-fiction outdoors writers